Prežba is a small inhabited island in the Croatian part of the Adriatic Sea, located northwest of the island of Lastovo in southern Dalmatia. It is connected to Lastovo by a bridge at the village of Pasadur on Lastovo. Prežba's area is 2.81 km2, but its coastline is 14.23 km long, due to the large number of coves on the island. Its highest peak is 136 m above sea level and there is a lighthouse on the south side of the island, across the bay from Ubli. The island was used by the Yugoslav People's Army as a military base containing a tunnel and tunnel for ships.

See also
List of islands of Croatia

References

Uninhabited islands of Croatia
Islands of the Adriatic Sea
Landforms of Dubrovnik-Neretva County